Saint Theocharis of Nevşehir is a saint of the Greek Orthodox Church. He is considered a new martyr as he chose death over converting to Islam. His feast day is on August 20.

Biography
Saint Theocharis was a Cappadocian Greek. He was orphaned at a young age. With the Ottoman State at war, young Theocharis was taken to a concentration camp for Christian boys. There, he was spotted by the governor of Nevşehir who took a liking to the boy. The governor took Theocharis out of the camp and took him back to work on his estate.

The governor and his wife liked Theocharis so much that they decided to offer their daughter to him, upon the condition that he convert to Islam. Theocharis refused. This caused the Governor great offence and so he threatened Theocharis with hunger, torture and death. He was stoned and then hanged at noon on 20 August 1740.

References

1740 deaths
18th-century Eastern Orthodox martyrs
18th-century Greek people
Christians executed for refusing to convert to Islam
Deaths by hanging
Eastern Orthodox saints
Saints from Anatolia
People from Nevşehir
People executed by stoning
Year of birth unknown
Christian saints killed by Muslims
Persecution of Christians in the Ottoman Empire
Persecution of Eastern Orthodox Christians